"Ditto" is a song recorded by South Korean girl group NewJeans. It was released as the first single from their first single album OMG on December 19, 2022. The song was written by group member Minji, Ylva Dimberg, the Black Skirts, Oohyo, and producer 250.

"Ditto" was a huge commercial success in South Korea—it peaked at number one on the Circle Digital Chart for eleven non-consecutive weeks, becoming the song with the most weeks at number-one in the chart's history alongside BTS's "Dynamite" (2020). Internationally, "Ditto" topped the charts in Singapore, Taiwan, Vietnam and Indonesia and peaked within the top 10 on the Billboard Global 200 chart.

Background and release 
South Korean girl group NewJeans released their first eponymous extended play (EP) in August 2022 to commercial success and critical acclaim. The EP topped South Korea's Circle Music Chart, selling 311,200 copies in its first week.

On November 10, 2022, ADOR announced through NewJeans' social medias that the group would release their first single album, OMG, on January 2, 2023. CEO and executive producer Min Hee-jin stated that the release would be preceded by an unnamed single "prepared for [the group's] first winter with Bunnies (NewJeans' official fanbase)" and set to be released on December 19. The song's title, "Ditto", was announced on December 12 through three moving posters: one featured lyrics from the song, while the other two showed two rabbits, one red and the other white, running. The following day, Min stated that the project would feature artists Oohyo and the Black Skirts, who had written part of "Ditto"'s lyrics, and advertising director Shin Woo-seok, who had directed its two-part music video. "Ditto" was released on December 19 alongside its music video.

Music and lyrics 

"Ditto" was composed by Ylva Dimberg and 250, who also handled its production. Presented as a reinterpretation of the Baltimore club genre, "Ditto" is an electronic, pop, and lo-fi track influenced by house, UK garage, and Shibuya-kei. Joshua Minsoo Kim of NPR noted that the song "takes [further] that fascination with club music" first explored by the group in "Cookie". Y Magazine Yoo Seong-eun compared it to The Weeknd's alternative R&B track "Die for You" (2016).

"Ditto"'s lyrics were written by group member Minji, Ylva Dimberg, the Black Skirts, and Oohyo. The song is considered to be a confession of love, largely interpreted by reviewers as platonic. NewJeans sing "My feelings for you, like the memories we share, have grown so big,", hoping that they are reciprocated.

Critical reception 

Kim appreciated NewJeans' minimalist production choices that set them apart from their contemporaries in the K-pop scene. Ko Kyung-seok of the Hankook Ilbo praised 250's production and noted that the composition, though straightforward, "hides experimentation and complexity". Bang Ho-jung of Kookje Shinmoon was moved by the song and thought that the "simple sound" allows the listener to focus on the vocals, melody, and lyrics. Critic Kim Yun-ha deemed the composition "ordinary", but found the song emotionally touching, writing that "Ditto" encapsulates a winter made of "small fragments of memories that were hidden between the bone-chilling sub-zero cold, the huge tree, the noisy street scene and the laughter of friends".

Beats Per Minute JT Early wrote that the song "best captures the 'winter' side of the group, refreshing and slightly darker in the soundscape". Sara Delgrado of Teen Vogue deemed "Ditto" one of their best releases yet, while Rolling Stone India Divyansha Dongre said that the track was a "phenomenal" ending to their 2022 "musical chapter". Crystal Bell placed "Ditto" at number 25 in Mashable list of the 25 best K-pop songs of 2022.

Commercial performance 
"Ditto" debuted at number one on South Korea's Circle Digital Chart in the issue dated December 18–25, 2022, earning NewJeans their second number-one single in the country after "Attention". It remained atop the chart for five consecutive weeks. The song debuted at number one on the Billboard Vietnam Hot 100 in the chart issue dated December 29, 2022, becoming their first number-one single in the country. It topped the chart for three consecutive weeks, after which it was replaced by their own "OMG", making NewJeans the international artist with the most weeks atop the chart. "Ditto" reached number one on the Indonesia Songs chart. The song spent three and four consecutive weeks atop the Singapore's Top Streaming Chart and the Taiwan Songs chart, respectively. In Japan, the song peaked at number 12 on the Billboard Japan Hot 100 and number 13 on the Oricon Combined Singles Chart.

In the United Kingdom, "Ditto" was NewJeans' first entry on the Official Singles Chart, peaking at number 95. The song debuted at number 17 on the Bubbling Under Hot 100 in the chart issue dated January 7, 2023, and entered the US Billboard Hot 100 at number 96 two weeks later with 5.1 million US streams, becoming the group's first entry on the chart. They were the fastest Korean act to enter the chart and the fifth Korean group after Wonder Girls, BTS, Blackpink and Twice. The song peaked at number 82 in its fifth week on the chart. "Ditto" became NewJeans' highest-ranked song on the Billboard Argentina Hot 100, reaching number 43. It also charted in Australia (54), Canada (43), Hong Kong (3), Malaysia (2), the Netherlands (31), Philippines (2), and Portugal (153).

The song was NewJeans first top-10 hit on the Billboard Global Excl. US, peaking at number four with 41.9 million streams and 3,000 digital downloads sold in the period of December 30, 2022–January 5, 2023. It debuted at number 36 on the Billboard Global 200 in the chart issue dated December 31, 2022, and peaked at number eight two weeks later with 46.5 million streams and 4,000 digital downloads sold, making NewJeans the fourth Korean group to enter the chart's top-10 after BTS, Blackpink, and Big Bang.

Music video

Development 
Director Shin Woo-seok, CEO of South Korean video production company Dolphiners Films, was approached by Min to direct a music video about the relationship between idols and fans. She offered him full creative control, although she suggested Shin include a scene with "a deer standing alone in a snowy field". At the time, Shin wasn't interested in working in the idol industry, but found the offer intriguing and wanted to try something new. Shin said he "wanted to talk about the fact that the relationship between an idol and a fan ultimately comes to an end, the meaning of the process, and the existence of each other", but he was unsure of how the video would be received. The concept was approved by the label and Min introduced NewJeans to Shin, who described them as "pure and fun as kids their age".

Shin wanted to use an innovative scene composition compared to the "standardized framework" he had observed in most K-pop music videos. He introduced a sixth unnamed character, intended to symbolize NewJeans' fans, to provide a different point of view and to showcase the choreography in a way that fit into the story. Initially indicated as "A" in the script, Shin named the character Ban Hee-soo after the announcement of NewJeans' fandom name, Bunnies. The deer, instead, was meant to symbolize an ideal friend. Shin said he was influenced by a Greek myth of the goddess Circe found in Homer's Odyssey, where she transforms men into swines. Shin had initially planned to make only one music video, but decided to split it after the song was shortened. He explained that each part reflects one of two themes: hope and despair. 

The music video was mainly shot in three locations around Jung District, Daegu: Gyeseong Middle School, Cheongna Hill, and Dongsan Medical Center. Shin wanted to faithfully portray a Korean hagwon. While thinking back to his school days, he decided to shoot part of the video with a camcorder. Shin thought it could be a realistic and effective medium to convey Hee-soo close relationship with NewJeans, as she is shown filming her friends dancing with the camcorder. Since he didn't have times to realize CGI, Shin brought to set a real deer. Choi Hyun-wook and Park Ji-hu made cameo appearances.

Reception 
The music video drew attention for its "retro yet dreamy" atmosphere that reminded Generation X viewers of their school days. Several reviewers compared it to the Whispering Corridors film series (1998–2021; also known as the Girls' High School Ghost Story series); some reviewers also compared it to Love Letter (1995) and Hana and Alice (2004) by Japanese director Shunji Iwai, famous for depicting the sense of loss and anxiety of becoming an adult in his films. Bang felt emotional watching the music video as it evoked old memories. Benjamin praised the video for "perfectly" capturing "the loneliness and awkwardness one can feel in adolescence, even when surrounded by friends".Writing for Weekly Dong-a, music critic Mimyo wrote that NewJeans "challenges the idol fantasy": while idols usually create an emotional bond with fans by showing them all facets of their lives, in the music video NewJeans are depicted as "ghost-like" figures, whose past and relation to the public is unclear. Delgrado likened the "hazy visuals" to those of Sofia Coppola's films. According to Elle Korea, the music video contributed to the resurgence of camcorders.

Live performances and accolades 
NewJeans performed "Ditto" on South Korean music programs Inkigayo on January 15, 2023, and Music Bank on January 20 and 27, 2023, after having already won four trophies for the song in the previous weeks. They garnered four additional trophies, reaching a total of eight wins for "Ditto".

Credits and personnel 
Song

Credits adapted from Melon.
 Ylva Dimberg – composition, lyrics
 The Black Skirts – lyrics
 Oohyo – lyrics
 Minji (NewJeans) – lyrics
 250 – composition, instrumental, programming

Music video

Credits adapted from YouTube.

 Min Hee-jin – producer
 Dolphiners Films – production
 Shin Woo-seok – director, writer
 Jongho Baek – production manager
 Sunghun Lee – planning
 Hangyeol Lee – director of photography
 Sunghye Baik – director of photography
 Hayoung Shin – gaffer
 Doosoo Choi – gaffer
 Mimi Yang – art
 Sunyeon Kim – hair and make-up designer
 Ipsae Lee – costume designer
 Hansaem Kim – location manager
 Dahye Kim – location manager
 Hyeji Moon – location mixer
 Yoonseok Jang – VFX supervisor
 Hyunah Lee – DI colorist
 Joseph Ahn – sound mixing
 Yong Kim – music
 Hyunsoo Nam – key grip
 Hyeonjong Yun – boom operator
 Junghun Lee – line producer
 Chami Kwon – line producer
 Yumi Choi – style director, styling (ADOR)
 Giihee – hair styling (ADOR)
 Naree – hair styling (ADOR)
 Eunseo Lee – make-up (ADOR)
 Hyemin Kim – artist manager (ADOR)
 Seulgi Kim – artist manager (ADOR)
 Youngsil Hwang – sound designer
 Taeyoung Im – sound designer

Charts

Weekly charts

Monthly charts

Release history

See also 
 List of Circle Digital Chart number ones of 2022
 List of Circle Digital Chart number ones of 2023
 List of number-one songs of 2022 (Singapore)
 List of number-one songs of 2023 (Singapore)
 List of Inkigayo Chart winners (2023)
 List of Music Bank Chart winners (2023)
 List of Show! Music Core Chart winners (2023)

References 

2022 singles
2022 songs
Korean-language songs
NewJeans songs
Hybe Corporation singles
Gaon Digital Chart number-one singles
Number-one singles in Singapore